Leroy Franklin Moore (September 16, 1935-June 19, 2022) is a former American football player who played with the Boston Patriots, Buffalo Bills and Denver Broncos. He played college football at Fort Valley State University.

Father of Krip Hop nation founder and poet, Leroy F. Moore Jr.

References

1935 births
Boston Patriots players
Buffalo Bills players
Denver Broncos (AFL) players
Fort Valley State Wildcats football players
American football defensive ends
American Football League players